Myet Nu is a 2020 Burmese romantic-drama film starring Nay Toe and Wutt Hmone Shwe Yi. The film, produced by Shwe Myanmar Film Production premiered in Myanmar on January 23, 2020.

Cast
 Nay Toe as Thet Paing
 Wutt Hmone Shwe Yi as Jade
 Mone as Dr. Yin Myo Nwe

References

External links

2020 films
2020s Burmese-language films
Burmese romantic drama films
Films shot in Myanmar
2020 romantic drama films